Rubén Alberto Espinoza Molina (born 1 June 1961) is a retired Chilean international football midfielder.

Playing career
Espinoza was capped 31 times for the Chile national team between 1983 and 1991. This year he won the Libertadores de América Cup, with Colo-Colo. He made his debut for the national squad on 1983-04-28 in a friendly against Brazil.

Espinoza spent most of his career playing club football in Chile, and spent nine years with the Chile national team. He played one season with Mexican side Cruz Azul, helping the club reach the semi-finals where they lost to León. He finished his career playing in the USISL Select League for the Richmond Kickers.

Coaching career
In 2001 he had a stint as coach of O'Higgins. In 2006 he coached Unión San Felipe in the Primera B de Chile.

In 2015 he came to Ñublense as Sport Manager, assuming as interim coach in 2017.

References

External links
RSSSF

1961 births
Living people
People from Tomé
Chilean footballers
Chilean expatriate footballers
Chile international footballers
Association football midfielders
1983 Copa América players
1987 Copa América players
1991 Copa América players
Club Deportivo Universidad Católica footballers
Colo-Colo footballers
Cruz Azul footballers
O'Higgins F.C. footballers
Everton de Viña del Mar footballers
Unión Española footballers
Richmond Kickers players
Chilean Primera División players
Liga MX players
USISL Select League players
Chilean expatriate sportspeople in Mexico
Chilean expatriate sportspeople in the United States
Expatriate footballers in Mexico
Expatriate soccer players in the United States
Chilean football managers
O'Higgins F.C. managers
Unión San Felipe managers
Ñublense managers
Chilean Primera División managers
Primera B de Chile managers